Mike Lynch  is a cartoonist whose work can be seen in Reader's Digest, The Wall Street Journal, Playboy and other mass media markets.

Career
Mike Lynch illustrated the book Classical Music for Beginners, and drew the cover for Chamber Music Magazine. He spent five years working as a graphic artist for companies like Goldman Sachs and Deloitte & Touche.

Clients
His cartoons have appeared in Barron's, Harvard Business Review, The New York Daily News, Prospect, Punch, The Spectator, The Funny Times, First for Women, Chronicle of Higher Education and Brandweek.

Societies
He is the National Representative for the National Cartoonists Society, and Chair of the National Cartoonists Society Long Island Chapter aka the "Berndt Toast Gang". He is also a member of the Freelancers Union.

References

External links
 Official website

1962 births
Living people
American cartoonists
People from Iowa City, Iowa